D. K. Shroff manages actors in Bollywood. D. K . Shroff passed away on 18th Feb 2023.

References

Year of birth missing (living people)
Living people
Talent agents
Businesspeople from Mumbai